The banded apple pigmy (Stigmella malella) is a moth of the family Nepticulidae. It is found almost all of Europe, except Iceland and Norway.

The wingspan is .The head is ferruginous -ochreous, collar whitish. Antennal eyecaps whitish. Forewings dark fuscous ; a shining white fascia beyond middle. Hindwings grey. Adults are on wing from April to August.

The larvae feed on Malus x astracanica, Malus baccata, Malus domestica, Malus floribunda, Malus fusca, Malus ringo, Malus sylvestris and sometimes Prunus. They mine the leaves of their host plant. The mine consists of a corridor, sometimes widening only a little but sometimes strongly. At times ending in a secondary blotch. The frass is concentrated in a narrow central line.

References

External links
Swedish moths
Species info
Stigmella malella images at  Consortium for the Barcode of Life
lepiforum.de

Nepticulidae
Moths described in 1854
Moths of Europe